Alfred Skrobisch (November 19, 1913 – November 5, 1991) was an American fencer. He fenced for the Columbia Lions fencing team. He competed in the individual and team épée events at the 1952 Summer Olympics.

References

External links
 

1913 births
1991 deaths
American male épée fencers
Olympic fencers of the United States
Fencers at the 1952 Summer Olympics
Sportspeople from London
Columbia Lions fencers